Shahpur is a town and a nagar panchayat in Muzaffarnagar district in the Indian state of Uttar Pradesh. As of 2001, it had a population of 17,186.

Geography
It has an average elevation of 237 metres (777 feet).

Demographics
As of the 2001 Census of India, Shahpur had a population of 17,186. Males constitute 53% of the population and females 47%. Shahpur has an average literacy rate of 49%, lower than the national average of 59.5%: male literacy is 57%, and female literacy is 40%. In Shahpur, 18% of the population is under 6 years of age..

References

Cities and towns in Muzaffarnagar district